Cabrerets (Languedocien: Crabairet) is a commune in the Lot department in southwestern France.

The village of Cabrerets derives its name from cabre, meaning goat in the Occitan language.

Population

Geography
The village lies at the confluence of the rivers Sagne and Célé, at the foot of the Rochecourbe cliffs. The village also forms part of the pilgrimage route for those travelling to Santiago de Compostella and is the final stop before Cahors.

History
The overhanging cliffs that dominate the town are home to a ruined castle, built by the English and also known as the château du diable ("devil's castle"). The castle was first mentioned in a document dating from 1259, and was the medieval home of the lords of Barsac. In 1380, during the Hundred Years' War, it fell into the hands of a force from Aquitaine controlled by the English. It was liberated ten years later by Jean d'Hébrard, lord of Saint-Sulpice, who subsequently ordered its demolition.

The nearby Pech Merle cave is home to prehistoric cave paintings, being one of the few prehistoric sites in France which remain open to the general public.

The Château de Cabrerets has been listed since 1996 as a monument historique by the French Ministry of Culture. Construction began in the early years of the 16th century.

See also
Communes of the Lot department

References 

Communes of Lot (department)